Military Council for Angolan Resistance (COMIRA) was a militant organization that fought in the Angolan Civil War in the 1980s.

The militant wing of the National Liberation Front of Angola (FNLA) created COMIRA on August 12, 1980. P. Tuba and H. V. Nato led COMIRA upon its creation.

COMIRA leaders said they overthrew FNLA leader Holden Roberto on September 15, 1980 in Paris, France, making the FNLA a part of COMIRA.

See also
UNITA
MPLA

References

Angolan Civil War
African and Black nationalist organizations in Africa
Military history of Angola
National Liberation Front of Angola
Rebel groups in Angola